Gouramva Union is a Union parishad under Rampal Upazila of Bagerhat District in the division of Khulna, Bangladesh. It has an area of 33.38 km² (12.89 sq mi) and a population of 18,744.

References

Unions of Rampal Upazila
Unions of Bagerhat District
Unions of Khulna Division